Leionema ralstonii, is a small shrub with angular, smooth branchlets and pale green flowers in winter.  It is restricted to the south coast of New South Wales.

Description
The inflorescence is a tight cluster of 4-7 flowers at the end of branches. The hemispherical calyx is smooth and fleshy with triangular shaped lobes. Flowering occurs mostly in winter.

Taxonomy
This species was first formally described by Ferdinand von Mueller in 1860 and he gave it the name Eriostemon ralstonii and description was published in Fragmenta Phytographiae Australiae. In 1998 Paul G. Wilson changed the name to Leionema ralstonii and the name change was published in the journal Nuytsia.

Distribution and habitat
Leionema ralstonii is found growing on ridges and creeks in the Bega to Eden district on the south coast of New South Wales.

Conservation status
This species is classified as "vulnerable" by the Government of New South Wales Environment Protection and Biodiversity Conservation Act 1999.

References

phylicifolium
Sapindales of Australia
Flora of New South Wales
Taxa named by Ferdinand von Mueller